Nan of the North is a 1922 American adventure film serial directed by Duke Worne. The film is considered to be lost.

Cast
 Ann Little as Nan
 Tom London as Dick Driscoll (credited as Leonard Clapham)
 Joseph W. Girard as Yukon Hays
 Hal Wilson as Gaspar Le Sage
 Howard Crampton as Igloo
 J. Morris Foster as Bruce Vane
 Edith Stayart as Celeste
 Boris Karloff as Undetermined Role (uncredited)

Chapter titles
 Missile from Mars
 Fountain of Fury
 Brink of Despair
 In Cruel Clutches
 On Terror's Trail
 The Cards of Chance
 Into the Depths
 Burning Sands
 Power of Titano
 A Bolt from the Sky
 The Ride for a Life
 Adrift
 Facing Death at Sea
 The Volcano
 Consequences

See also
 List of film serials
 List of film serials by studio
 List of lost films
 Boris Karloff filmography

References

External links

1922 films
1922 lost films
1922 adventure films
American silent serial films
American black-and-white films
Northern (genre) films
Lost American films
Films directed by Duke Worne
American adventure films
1920s American films
Silent adventure films